Parorsidis nigrosparsa is a species of beetle in the family Cerambycidae. It was described by Pic in 1929.

References

Ancylonotini
Beetles described in 1929